Bordetella petrii is a bacterium of the genus Bordetella isolated from different habitats, including humans. B. petrii has the ability to grow under aerobic conditions and adapt to different environmental conditions. The complete genome of B. petrii has been sequenced.

References

External links
Type strain of Bordetella petrii at BacDive -  the Bacterial Diversity Metadatabase

Burkholderiales
Bacteria described in 2001